We Can Do Anything is the ninth studio album by U.S. band Violent Femmes, released March 4, 2016. It is the band's first studio album since 2000's Freak Magnet. “We Can Do Anything” features Boston-based drummer, Brian Viglione, best known for his work with The Dresden Dolls.

Artwork 
The cover artwork is by Barenaked Ladies multi-instrumentalist Kevin Hearn, with whom Violent Femmes toured in 2015.

Reception

Consequence of Sound described the album as one that "ebbs and flows, but in the end, it has enough going for it to merit its existence".

Track listing

Personnel 
Violent Femmes
 Gordon Gano – lead vocals, guitars, violin, banjo
 Brian Ritchie – acoustic bass guitar, vocals
 Brian Viglione – drums, percussion, vocals

The Horns of Dilemma
 John Sparrow – cajón
 Jeff Hamilton – acoustic guitar, mandolin, 6 string banjo, ukulele, vocals, percussion
 Blaise Garza – contrabass, bass, baritone and tenor saxophones
 Kevin Hearn – accordion, acoustic guitar, piano, organ, vocals
 Paul Cebar – electric 12-string guitar

Technical
 Jeff Hamilton – production
 Chris Gehringer – mastering
 John Agnello – mixing
 Kevin Arndt – engineering
 Martin Bisi – engineering
 Warren A. Bruleigh – production assistance

Artwork
 Antoine Moonen – design
 Kevin Hearn – cover art
 Herman Asph – photography

Charts

References

Violent Femmes albums
2016 albums
PIAS Recordings albums